Laktaši Sports Hall is an indoor sporting arena located in Laktaši, Bosnia and Herzegovina. The seating capacity of the arena is 3,050 spectators for sporting events.

It is home to the KK Igokea basketball team.

External links
 Venue information

Indoor arenas in Bosnia and Herzegovina
Basketball venues in Bosnia and Herzegovina
KK Igokea
Buildings and structures in Republika Srpska